The levelized cost of electricity (LCOE) is a measure of the average net present cost of electricity generation for a generator over its lifetime. It is used for investment planning and to compare different methods of electricity generation on a consistent basis. 

The more general term levelized cost of energy may include the costs of either electricity or heat. The latter is also referred to as levelized cost of heat or levelized cost of heating (LCOH), or levelized cost of thermal energy. 

The LCOE "represents the average revenue per unit of electricity generated that would be required to recover the costs of building and operating a generating plant during an assumed financial life and duty cycle", and is calculated as the ratio between all the discounted costs over the lifetime of an electricity generating plant divided by a discounted sum of the actual energy amounts delivered.   Inputs to LCOE are chosen by the estimator. They can include the cost of capital, decommissioning, fuel costs, fixed and variable operations and maintenance costs, financing costs, and an assumed utilization rate.

Definition
The cost of energy production depends on costs during the expected lifetime of the plant and the amount of energy it is expected to generate over its lifetime. The levelized cost of electricity (LCOE) is the average cost in currency per energy unit, for example, EUR per kilowatt-hour or AUD per megawatt-hour. The LCOE is an estimation of the cost of production of energy, thus it tells nothing about the price for consumers and is most meaningful from the investor’s point of view.

The LCOE is calculated by adding up all costs of production, divided by the total amount of energy it is expected to generate. In formula:

{|
|-
|It || : || investment expenditures in the year t
|-
|Mt|| : || operations and maintenance expenditures in the year t
|-
|Ft|| : || fuel expenditures in the year t
|-
|Et|| : || electrical energy generated in the year t
|-
|r || : || discount rate
|-
|n || : || expected lifetime of system or power station
|}
 

Care should be taken in comparing different LCOE studies and the sources of the information as the LCOE for a given energy source is highly dependent on the assumptions, financing terms and technological deployment analyzed. For any given electricity generation technology, LCOE varies significantly from region to region, depending on factors such as the cost of fuel or energy resources such as wind.

Thus, a key requirement for the analysis is a clear statement of the applicability of the analysis based on justified assumptions. In particular, for LCOE to be usable for rank-ordering energy-generation alternatives, caution must be taken to calculate it in "real" terms, i.e. including adjustment for expected inflation.

Assumptions

Capacity factor 
The assumption of the capacity factor has a significant impact on the calculation of LCOE as it determines the actual amount of energy produced by specific installed power. Formulas that output cost per unit of energy ($/MWh) already account for the capacity factor, while formulas that output cost per unit of power ($/MW) do not.

Discount rate 
Cost of capital expressed as the discount rate is one of the most controversial inputs into the LCOE equation, as it significantly impacts the outcome and a number of comparisons assume arbitrary discount rate values with little transparency of why a specific value was selected. Comparisons that assume public funding, subsidies, and social cost of capital tend to choose low discount rates (3%), while comparisons prepared by private investment banks tend to assume high discount rates (7-15%) associated with commercial for-profit funding. Assuming a low discount rate favours nuclear and sustainable energy projects, which require a high initial investment but then have low operational costs.

In a 2020 analysis by Lazard, sensitivity to discount factor changes in the range of 6% - 16% results in different LCOE values but the identical ordering of different types of power plants if the discount rates are the same for all technologies.

Usage and limitations
LCOE is often cited as a convenient summary measure of the overall competitiveness of different generating technologies, however, it has potential limitations. Investment decisions consider the specific technological and regional characteristics of a project, which involve many other factors not reflected in some instances of LCOE. One of the most important potential limitations of LCOE is that it may not control for time effects associated with matching electricity production to demand. This can happen at two levels:
 Dispatchability, the ability of a generating system to come online, go offline, or ramp up or down, quickly as demand swings.
 The extent to which the availability profile matches or conflicts with the market demand profile.
In particular, if the costs of matching grid energy storage are not included in projects for variable renewable energy sources such as solar and wind, they may produce electricity when it is not needed in the grid without storage. The value of this electricity may be lower than if it was produced at another time, or even negative. At the same time, variable sources can be competitive if they are available to produce when demand and prices are highest, such as solar during summertime mid-day peaks seen in hot countries where air conditioning is a major consumer. 

To ensure enough electricity is always available to meet demand, storage or backup generation may be required, which adds costs that are not included in some instances of LCOE. Excess generation when not needed may force curtailments, thus reducing the revenue of an energy provider.  Decisions about investments in energy generation technologies may be guided by other measures such as the levelized cost of storage (LCOS) and the levelized avoided cost of energy (LACE), in addition to the LCOE.  

Another potential limitation of LCOE is that some analyses may not adequately consider the indirect costs of generation. These can include the social cost of greenhouse gas emissions, other environmental externalities such as air pollution, or grid upgrade requirements. 

The LCOE for a given generator tends to be inversely proportional to its capacity. For instance, larger power plants have a lower LCOE than smaller power plants. Therefore, making investment decisions based on insufficiently comprehensive LCOE can lead to a bias towards larger installations while overlooking opportunities for energy efficiency and conservation unless their costs and effects are calculated, and included alongside LCOE numbers for other options such as generation infrastructure for comparison. If this is omitted or incomplete, LCOE may not give a comprehensive picture of potential options available for meeting energy needs.

See also
Cost of electricity by source
Levelized cost of water

References

Electricity economics